Besnard is a French surname.

Besnard  may also refer to:

Besnard Lake, Canada
Besnard Point, Palmer Archipelago, Antarctica

See also
The Besnard Lakes,  Canadian indie rock band from Montreal, Quebec, Canada